Aaya Ram Gaya Ram expression in politics of India means the frequent floor-crossing, turncoating, switching parties and political horse trading in the legislature by the elected politicians and political parties. The term originated in 1967 in Haryana where excessive political horse trading, counter horse trading and counter-counter horse trading took place; triggering several rounds of frequent political defections by the serial-turncoat politicians within a span of few weeks; resulting in the dissolution of the Haryana Legislative Assembly and consequently the fresh elections were held in 1968. It became the subject of numerous jokes and cartoons. After 1967, several parties in India often continued to be involved in this type of political horse-trading to grab the power. To end this trend, the anti-defection law was made in 1985. The trend still continues to surface every now and then, by exploiting the loopholes in existing anti-defection laws to benefit a specific party through further horse-trading, counter-defections, formation of unholy alliances and electoral fraud. This misuse, by the collusion of corrupt politicians/parties with the partisan Speaker and/or Governor, can be somewhat prevented by the political opponents (losing side in the political intrigue) by going to the court for immediate intervention.

Origin of the term
The term was coined when Gaya Lal, a Member of the Legislative Assembly from Hodal in Haryana, won elections as an independent candidate in 1967 and joined the Indian National Congress, and thereafter he changed parties thrice in a fortnight, first by politically defecting from the Indian National Congress to the United Front, then counter defecting back to INC, and then counter-counter-defected within nine hours to United Front again. When Gaya Lal quit the United Front and join the INC, then INC leader Rao Birendra Singh who had engineered Gaya Lal's defection to INC, brought Gaya Lal to a press conference at Chandigarh and declared "Gaya Ram was now Aya Ram". This triggered the worst cyclic game of the political defections, the counter-defections, the counter-counter-defections, and so on, eventually resulting in the dissolution of the Haryana Legislative Assembly and the imposition of President's rule.

Infamous Lals of Haryana politics

Even after 1967, Gaya Lal frequently kept switching political parties and contested legislative assembly elections in Haryana under numerous parties, i.e. the Akhil Bhartiya Arya Sabha in 1972, joined the Bhartiya Lok Dal under Chaudhary Charan Singh in 1974, won the seat as a Janata Party candidate in 1977 after the Lok Dal merged with the Janata Party. Gaya Lal, a frequent floor-crosser who became the source of the coining of the term Aaya Ram Gaya Ram, his son Udai Bhan is also a politician who has frequently crossed the floor, in 1987 he won legislative assembly elections as a candidate of the Lok Dal (Bahuguna faction), in 1991 lost as a candidate of the Janata party, in 1996 lost as an independent candidate, in 2000 joined INLD after winning as an independent candidate but faced charges under the anti-defection law in 2004 for crossing-over to INC, in 2005 won as a candidate of INC.

Since the formation of Haryana in 1966, the state politics became infamously dominated by the nepotistic clans of 5 political dynasts, Lal trio (Devi Lal, Bansi Lal and Bhajan Lal) as well as the Hooda clan and Rao Birender clan.

The cure – anti-defection law 
1985 Anti-defection Act was passed in 1985 to prevent such defections. It was included in constitution by Rajiv Gandhi government as the tenth schedule of Indian constitution.

The Anti-defection Act, applicable to both Parliament and state assemblies, specifies the process for the Presiding Officer of a legislature (Speaker) to disqualify a legislators on grounds of defection based on a petition by any other member of the House. Defection is defined as either voluntarily giving up the membership of his party or disobeying (abstaining or voting against) the directives (political whip) of the party leadership on a vote in legislature. Legislators can change their party without the risk of disqualification to merge with or into another party provided that at least two-thirds of the legislators are in favour of the merger, neither the members who decide to merge, nor the ones who stay with the original party will face disqualification. The Supreme Court mandated that in the absence of a formal resignation, the giving up of membership can be determined by the conduct of a legislator, such as publicly expressing opposition to their party or support for another party, engaging in anti-party activities, criticizing the party on public forums on multiple occasions, and attending rallies organised by opposition parties. The Presiding Officer has no time limit to make his decision, for example if less than two third legislators of party defect then the Presiding Officer can use his discretion to either disqualify the  legislators before a vote of no confidence is held or delay the decision on disqualification until after the "vote of no confidence" is held. In another example, if less than two third legislators of party defect together in more than one batch in such a way that the combined strength of the united defectors is more than two third before the decision on the defection is made, the Presiding Officer can use his discretion to either disqualify each batch of the defecting legislators or accept the combined batches of the defectors as the legal defection (no disqualification). This allows a possibility of the misuse by the Presiding Officer to benefit a specific party through further horse-trading (counter-defections), formation of unholy alliances or electoral fraud by exploiting the loopholes in the existing anti-defection laws. However, the decision of the Presiding Officer is subject to the judicial review by courts.

See also
 Aisle (political term)
 Conscience vote
 Cronyism
 Keep the bastards honest
 Political corruption
 Political nepotism
 Transformism, flexible centrist coalition government by unification of the extreme left and right
 Whip (politics), voting against the party line is known as "defying the whip"

References

Political terminology in India
Politics of Haryana